The W is the third studio album by American hip hop group Wu-Tang Clan. It was released on November 21, 2000, by Loud Records. After their 1997 album Wu-Tang Forever, several of the group's members released solo projects before The W, which has a more rugged, less polished sound than that of most Wu-Tang related albums from that era. The album also features guest appearances from Isaac Hayes, Redman, Nas, Busta Rhymes, Snoop Dogg and Junior Reid. It is the group's last album to feature Ol' Dirty Bastard before his death in 2004, as he was absent from their next album, Iron Flag (2001).

The album debuted at number five on the Billboard 200, and number one on the Top R&B/Hip Hop Albums chart with 301,000 copies sold in the first week. It produced several singles, which also charted as well. The album was certified platinum by the Recording Industry Association of America (RIAA). Upon its release, The W received largely positive reviews from most music critics based on an aggregate score of 80/100 from Metacritic.

Critical reception

The W received generally positive reviews from music critics. At Metacritic, which assigns a normalized rating out of 100 to reviews from mainstream critics, the album received an average score of 80, based on 17 reviews. Aside from calling Wu-Tang "the best rap group ever," Kris Ex of Rolling Stone called the album "A sonic gestalt that exists somewhere between the Queensbridge projects and OutKast's Stankonia." Entertainment Weeklys David Browne remarked that the members sound "utterly mellow on their third album." He further stated "The W forgoes innovation and simply revels in the Clan's strengths: the way their star rappers toss around rhymes as if playing catch; RZA's skulking, string-enhanced beats." Kelefa Sanneh of The Village Voice declared it "The best-produced Wu-affiliated album since GZA's 1995 Liquid Swords. Rob Fearn of Q stated "The W is largely a return to murky idiosyncratic form after 1997's filler-bloated Wu-Tang Forever. Weighing in at a svelte 60 minutes, it plays to the group's main strengths: brutal hooks and scary ambience." Dave Heaton of PopMatters described it as "the sound of a group growing up and realizing that collaboration can lead to endless creativity" and commented on its significance in the group's catalogue, stating:

Despite commenting that "The W isn't quite the masterpiece it sounds like after the first few tracks [...] it falls prey to inconsistency, resulting in half-formed tracks", AllMusic editor John Bush praised the album's "back-to-basics approach", writing that it succeeds "not only because it rightly puts the focus back on the best cadre of rappers in the world of hip-hop, but also because RZA's immense trackmaster talents can't help but shine through [...] When they're hitting on all cylinders, Wu-Tang Clan are nearly invincible." Steve Jones of USA Today called it "sharply focused." S. H. Fernando Jr. of Vibe called it "a dense, demented, 15-song opus that will now draw comparisons to the now classic 36 Chambers." He further noted its "originality, innovation, and a mastery of the fundamentals of beats and rhymes", and commented "This album goes against the grain of everything that's going on in rap right now". Sasha Frere-Jones of Spin complimented RZA's diverse range of production and the group's word play; in The Rolling Stone Album Guide, Frere-Jones called the production "possibly RZA's most consistent yet." In his consumer guide for The Village Voice, critic Robert Christgau commented that he "can't swear they've taken their moral vision much beyond 'Handle your bid and kill no kids'", but praised RZA's production and stated "He serves up a bounty of song-centered musique trouvée and stomach-churning beats from anywhere [...] Far from straining, he's gone sensei, achieving a craft in which the hand leads the mind".

Accolades
The W appeared on numerous Albums of the Year lists by several American publishers, such as Rolling Stone, Spin, and The Village Voice. The album also appeared on the same lists for several international publishers, such as NME, The Wire and Uncut from the United Kingdom, and Liberation and Les Inrockuptibles from France, for which it was ranked number one in the latter. In 2005, Hip Hop Connection ranked the album number 70 on their 100 Greatest Rap Albums 1995–2005 list. One year later, the album was included in Gary Mulholland 261 Greatest Albums Since Punk and Disco. In 2008, The W was included in Tom Moon's 1000 Recordings to Hear Before You Die, and in 2009, Pitchfork Media ranked it number 162 on their Top 200 Albums of the 2000s list, stating "The W was as surprising as it was pleasing, packing some of the RZA's best production work, and some of the group's best music."

Commercial performance
The W debuted at number five on the US Billboard 200, and number one on the US Top R&B/Hip Hop Albums charts, selling 301,000 copies in the first week. On December 14, 2000, the album was certified platinum by the Recording Industry Association of America (RIAA) for shipments of over a million copies in the United States. As of April 2014, the album has sold 1.1 million copies in the United States.

Track listing

Track listing information is taken from the official liner notes and AllMusic.

Notes
 "Careful (Click, Click)" and "Protect Ya Neck (The Jump Off)" feature raps by Cappadonna.
 "Do You Really (Thang, Thang)" features raps by Streetlife and uncredited vocals by DJ Kay Slay.
 "Gravel Pit" features additional vocals by Paulissa Moorman.
 "Jah World" contains the uncredited hidden bonus track "Hand Clap", produced by Allah Mathematics.

Sample credits
 "Intro (Shaolin Finger Jab)/Chamber Music" contains dialogue Five Deadly Venoms.
 "Hollow Bones" contains a sample of "Is It Because I’m Black" by Syl Johnson.
 "One Blood Under W" contains samples of "One Blood" by Junior Reid, and a sample of "James Bond Theme" by The John Barry Orchestra.
 "Protect Ya Neck (The Jump Off)" contains samples of "Sing a Simple Song" by Sly and the Family Stone and "Oh, Pretty Woman" by Albert King.
 "I Can’t Go to Sleep" contains a sample of "Walk on By" by Isaac Hayes.
 "Do You Really (Thang, Thang)" contains a sample of "Hang On, Sloopy" by David Porter.

Personnel

RZA – performer, producer, executive producer
GZA – performer
Ol' Dirty Bastard – performer
Method Man – performer
Raekwon – performer
Ghostface Killah – performer, executive producer
Inspectah Deck – performer
U-God – performer
Masta Killa – performer
Cappadonna – performer
Junior Reid – performer
Redman – performer
Nas – performer
Isaac Hayes – performer

Busta Rhymes – performer
Snoop Dogg – performer
Streetlife – performer
Paulissa Moorman – vocals
DJ Kayslay – performer
Mathematics – producer
Oli Grant – executive producer
James Cruz – mastering
Dylan Dresdow – tracking engineer, mixing engineer
Jose Reynoso – engineer
Michael Lavine – photography
David Bett – package design
Liz Hausle – product manager
 Monica Morrow – Stylist

Charts

Weekly charts

Year-end charts

Certifications

References

Further reading

External links
 
 

Wu-Tang Clan albums
2000 albums
Columbia Records albums
Loud Records albums
Albums produced by Mathematics
Albums produced by RZA